Afanasy is the Russian form of Athanasios, a Greek name meaning "immortal". It may refer to:

People:
 Afanasy Bagration, Prince Adarnase of Kartli (1707–1784), Georgian prince royal and Russian Empire general
 Afanasy Beloborodov (1903–1990), Russian general
 Afanasy Fet (1820–1892), Russian poet
 Afanasy Grigoriev (1782–1868), Russian architect
 Afanasy Nikitin (died 1472), Russian merchant and traveler
 Afanasy Ordin-Nashchokin (1605–1680), Russian statesman
 Afanasy Razmaritsyn (1844–1917), Russian-Ukrainian painter
 Afanasy Seredin-Sabatin (1860–1921), Russian architect and journalist, first Western architect to live and work in the Korean Empire
 Afanasy Shchapov (1830–1876), Russian historian

Fictional people:
 Afanasy Ivanovich Tovstogub, the main character of Nikolai Gogol's short story The Old World Landowners

The surname Afanasyev is derived from the name. The surname Afonin is derived from Afonya, the short form of the name.

Slavic masculine given names
Russian masculine given names